"Somebody Like That" is a song co-written and recorded by the Canadian country music artist Tenille Arts. The song was co-written with Allison Veltz, as well as the track's producer Alex Kline. It was the third single from Arts' second album Love, Heartbreak, & Everything in Between. Kline made history in January 2021 as the first solo female producer to have a song performed by a female artist reach the top 15 on American country radio. In April 2021, the song hit #1 on the Mediabase Country Aircheck chart in the U.S., giving Arts the first #1 for a Canadian artist since Emerson Drive's "Moments" in 2007.

Background
Arts remarked that she and her co-writers wanted to get away from writing break-up songs and wanted to "write something positive that was uptempo and fun, but still had substance to it, and was still... a really positive way of looking at love". The song is about searching for "epic love that lasts a lifetime" and not settling until you find it. Arts and her co-writers took inspiration from couples they looked up to, including their parents and grandparents.

Critical reception
Billy Dukes of Taste of Country called the track "a love song presented with great confidence and heart". The song was named Top Country Pick of the Week on January 10, 2020.

Commercial performance
"Somebody Like That" peaked at number 9 on the Billboard Canada Country chart, her highest-charting song in Canada to date. It has reached peaks of number 3 on Country Airplay, number 9 on Hot Country Songs, and number 59 on the Billboard Hot 100 in the United States.

Release and promotion
"Somebody Like That" was released to digital retailers and streaming platforms on September 27, 2019, and was shortly released to Canadian country radio after. 19th & Grand Records and Reviver Records jointly released the song to American country radio on January 13, 2020. In late April, Reviver split with Arts' promotion and label team, and the song was solely promoted by 19th & Grand afterwards.

Track listings
Digital download – single
 "Somebody Like That" – 3:18

Digital download – single
 "Somebody Like That" (acoustic) – 3:14

Charts

Weekly charts

Year-end charts

Certifications

Notes

References

2019 songs
2019 singles
2020 singles
Tenille Arts songs
Songs written by Tenille Arts